Derj may refer to:
 Derj, Albania
 Derj, Iran